Pol-e Shurab (also Romanized as Pol-e Shūrāb; also known as Pol-e Shūrāb-e ‘Olyā) is a village in Shurab Rural District, Veysian District, Dowreh County, Lorestan Province, Iran. At the 2006 census, its population was 204, in 51 families.

References 

Towns and villages in Dowreh County